Buvinda Vallis is a valley in the Cebrenia quadrangle of Mars, located at 33.4 N and 208.1 W.  It is 119.6 km long.  It was named after a classical river in Hibernia and the present River Boyne, Ireland.

References 

Valleys and canyons on Mars
Cebrenia quadrangle